Taran may refer to:
 Taran, East Azerbaijan (طاران - Ţārān)
 Taran, Meyaneh (طاران - Ţārān), East Azerbaijan Province
 Taran, Ilam (ترن - Taran)
 Taran, Sistan and Baluchestan (طران - Ţarān)